Kniphofia nana is a plant species in the family Asphodeloideae. It is endemic to Zaïre (Democratic Republic of the Congo) in central Africa.

References

External links

nana
Endemic flora of the Democratic Republic of the Congo
Plants described in 1974